Sam Schröder and Niels Vink defeated Donald Ramphadi and Ymanitu Silva in the final, 6–1, 6–3 to win the quad doubles wheelchair tennis title at the 2023 Australian Open. With the win, Schröder and Vink completed both a non-calendar-year Grand Slam and the career Super Slam in wheelchair quad doubles.

Andy Lapthorne and David Wagner were the defending champions, but lost in the semifinals to Ramphadi and Silva.

Seeds

Draw

Bracket

References

External links
 Drawsheet on ausopen.com

Wheelchair Quad Doubles
2023 Quad Doubles